Sex & Religion is the third studio album by American guitarist Steve Vai, released under the band name "Vai" on July 23, 1993 through Relativity Records. It is known as the first major appearance of future Devin Townsend Project and Strapping Young Lad singer and guitarist Devin Townsend, who performed vocals for the album. Townsend also co-wrote the tracks "Pig" and "Just Cartilage", the latter of which was only released as a bonus track in Japan. Vai also co-wrote "In My Dreams with You" with Desmond Child and Roger Greenawalt.

Sex & Religion reached No. 48 on the U.S. Billboard 200, No. 17 in the UK albums chart and also charted within the top 60 in four other countries. "In My Dreams with You" was released as a single, reaching No. 36 on Billboard'''s Mainstream Rock chart.

The album's cover art appears to be a reference to the famous artistic depictions of Saint Sebastian.

Background and conflict
For Sex & Religion, Vai wished to put together a band of "monster musicians" which included himself, Townsend, drummer and fellow Frank Zappa alumnus Terry Bozzio, and bassist T. M. Stevens. It was originally intended for each musician to contribute ideas and play a large role in the creative process, but Vai ended up micro-managing the whole project, which caused much conflict during the making of the album. As Vai explains, there was heavy expectation to make another album in the style of Passion and Warfare (1990), but he instead made the decision to go in a radically different direction, therefore confounding many fans and critics. The band split up after the album was finished, and Vai subsequently toured only with Townsend and several session drummers and bassists (including Abe Laboriel Jr., Toss Panos, and Scott Thunes).

Critical reception

Stephen Thomas Erlewine at AllMusic gave Sex & Religion'' two stars out of five, calling it "the most predictable and conventional—not to mention boring—[album] of Vai's usually remarkable career" and criticizing the band as being "pedestrian".

Track listing

Personnel
Steve Vai – guitar, vocals, arrangement, engineering, production
Devin Townsend – lead vocals
Terry Bozzio – drums
T. M. Stevens – bass
Kane Roberts – background vocals
Bernie Grundman – mastering

Chart performance

Album

Singles

References

External links
In Review: Vai "Sex & Religion" at Guitar Nine Records

Steve Vai albums
1993 albums
Relativity Records albums